Nisabdham is a 2017 Indian Tamil-language social drama film written and directed by Michael Arun. Featuring Ajay, Abhinaya and Sathanya in the lead roles, the film's score and soundtrack is composed by Shawn Jazeel. Nisabdham tells the story of a child, who is sexually abused and how her parents tackle the situation. The film began production during March 2015 and was released on 10 March 2017.
It is the remake of 2013 Korean film  Hope by director Lee Joon-ik.

Cast

Ajay as Aadhi
Abhinaya as Aadhira
Sathanya as Bhoomi
Kishore as Pervez Ahmed
Ramakrishna as a judge
A. Venkatesh as the public prosecutor
Palani as Shankar 
Ruthu as Therapist
Hamsa as Matilda
Venkatesh Babu as the antagonist
R. T. Kumar as the defence lawyer
 Nitin Thomas as Police Officer

Production
Debutant director Michael Arun, who had previously worked as an associate director in the production studio Super Good Films and as a co-director in the film Thagaraaru (2013), wrote the story about a child, who is sexually abused and how her parents tackle the situation, after hearing about a real life incident in Bangalore. The film began production in mid-2016 and Arun cast Abhinaya in a leading role with Savitha Reddy working as a dubbing artiste. Newcomer Ajay, Kishore and child actress Sathanya were also selected for pivotal roles. While composing the soundtrack, newcomer composer Shawn Jazeel brought in cellist Tina Guo of Game of Thrones fame and Serbian instrumentalist Vladiswar Nadishana for the background score.

Soundtrack

The film's music was composed by Shawn Jazeel, while the audio rights of the film was acquired by Raagam Audios. The album released on 23 February 2017 and featured sixteen tracks.

Release
The film opened on 10 March 2017 across Tamil Nadu alongside higher profile releases in Motta Shiva Ketta Shiva and Maanagaram. In their review, a critic from Deccan Chronicle wrote "kudos to the director for handling the disturbing subject with lots of sensitivity" and "there may be a few glitches, but nevertheless, it is an honest attempt from Arun". The New Indian Express also labelled the film as "promising work" stating "lending a realistic tone to his story telling, the director avoids the clichéd approach to such themes" and that "it's more an emotional take on the subject as seen from the perspective of the victim and her parents, than a suspenseful, investigative mode of treatment". The Times of India wrote "There are two ways to look at Nisabdham. If you are the glass-half-full type, you would agree that the tone wildly swings between somewhat tactful and full-blown melodrama; the staging feels TV serial-ish; the acting is ineffective; the court scenes are so dated" but "still, you might be able to brush aside many of the film's failures under the carpet because the film's intentions are noble and some of the moments bring a lump to your throat". Likewise, Sify.com concluded that "Nisabdham is indeed an honest attempt and it can be watchable for the message delivered but we only wish the director could've have taken more care with dialogues and execution." A critic from The Hindu also noted "a genuine endeavour to make a socially-relevant film goes awry and Nisabdham is barely watchable".

References

External links
 

2017 films
2010s Tamil-language films
Films about child abuse
Films set in Bangalore
Films shot in Bangalore
Indian drama films
2017 directorial debut films